Oedudes spectabilis is a species of beetle in the family Cerambycidae. It was described by Dru Drury in 1782. It is known from Colombia, Mexico and Panama.

References

Hemilophini
Beetles described in 1782